Hans Kraus (1905–1995) was an Austrian rock climber and doctor of sports medicine.

Hans Kraus or Hans Krause may also refer to:

 Hans P. Kraus (1907–1988), Austrian book and manuscript dealer
 Hansi Kraus (born 1952 as "Hans Krause"), German actor

See also 
 Hans-Georg Kraus (born 1949), German footballer
 Hans-Helmuth Krause (1905–1944), German Olympic athlete
 Hans-Henrik Krause (1918–2002), Danish actor and film director